Anthony R. Dolan (born in Norwalk, Connecticut, July 7, 1948) is a Pulitzer Prize-winning journalist and was a speechwriter for President Ronald Reagan from March 1981 until the end of Reagan's second term in 1989. Dolan served as the Director of Special Research and Issues and in the Office of Research and Policy at the Headquarters of the Reagan-Bush Committee. Under the name Tony Dolan he had been, for a time, a conservative folk-singer who put out the album "Cry, The Beloved Country" and appeared on The Merv Griffin Show.

He won the 1978 Pulitzer Prize for Local Investigative Specialized Reporting for a series of articles on municipal corruption published in The Stamford Advocate. During the presidency of President George W. Bush, Dolan served as Senior Advisor in the office of Secretary of State (December 2000 to July 2001) and Special Advisor in the Office of the Secretary of Defense (August 2001 to December 2007).  As Reagan's speechwriter, he wrote the speeches "Ash Heap of History" (1982) and "Evil Empire" (1983).

His late brother Terry Dolan was co-founder and chairman of the National Conservative Political Action Committee (NCPAC).

Notes

External links
 Ronald Reagan Library Collections 

1948 births
20th-century American journalists
American male journalists
American folk singers
American newspaper people
American speechwriters
American anti-corruption activists
Connecticut Republicans
Living people
Pulitzer Prize for Investigative Reporting winners
White House Directors of Speechwriting